Elena Pautova (born 22 January 1986) is a Paralympian athlete from Russia competing mainly in category T12 middle distance events. She is a two times Paralympic gold medalist and three times World Championship gold medalist in the 1500m race. Pautova also broke the world record in the T13 5000m event in 2003.

Career history
Pautova, who is visually impaired, first took to athletics while she attended a specialised boarding school in Armavir, Russia. She began competing competitively whilst still a teenager, and she competed in both middle and long distance events. At the age of 17 she entered an international meet in Quebec, Canada and ran in a T13 5000m contest. There she posted an officially recognized time of 17:50.45, a new world record. Due to the rarity of official T13 5000m races at major competitions, Pautova's record, as of 2013, still stands. Pautova then switched to middle-distance events, and at the age of 18 she was selected for her first Paralympics, chosen to represent Russia at the 2004 Summer Paralympics in Athens. It was an extremely successful competition for Pautova, winning the gold medal in the T12 1500m and a bronze medal in the T12 800m.

In 2006, she travelled to Assen where she took part in the Athletics World Championships. There she entered her favoured two events the 800, and 1,500m, and finished with an identical result to Athens; a gold in the 1,500m and bronze in the 800m. She returned to the Paralympics in 2008 in Beijing, China, winning two more bronze medals in the T13 1500m and the joint classified T12/13 800m.

In 2011, she retained her World title in the 1,500m, successfully defending it at the 2011 IPC Athletics World Championships in Christchurch, New Zealand. Then in the run-up to the 2012 London Paralympics, she took the gold, again in the 1,500m, at the 2012 European Championships in Stadskanaal. In London she posted a season's best of 4:37.65 to beat her nearest rival, Spain's Elena Congost, by almost seven seconds to take her second Paralympic gold medal. After her triumph in London, Pautova was awarded the Order of Honour, and received her medal form President Vladimir Putin at a ceremony held in the Kremlin.

In 2013 Pautova secured a third World gold title in the 1,500m with a win at the  2013 IPC Athletics World Championships in Lyon, making her the undefeated World champion at that distance for eight years.

References

External links
 

Paralympic athletes of Russia
Athletes (track and field) at the 2004 Summer Paralympics
Athletes (track and field) at the 2008 Summer Paralympics
Athletes (track and field) at the 2012 Summer Paralympics
Paralympic gold medalists for Russia
Paralympic bronze medalists for Russia
Living people
Russian female middle-distance runners
World record holders in Paralympic athletics
1986 births
Recipients of the Order of Honour (Russia)
Medalists at the 2004 Summer Paralympics
Medalists at the 2008 Summer Paralympics
Medalists at the 2012 Summer Paralympics
Paralympic medalists in athletics (track and field)
Athletes (track and field) at the 2020 Summer Paralympics
Sportspeople from Krasnodar Krai
Visually impaired middle-distance runners
Paralympic middle-distance runners